The Valur men's handball is a Iceland team handball club from Reykjavík, that plays in the Úrvalsdeild karla.

History

The Valur men's handball team has a long history in Icelandic handball, the club is one of the most successful in the sport in Iceland: no team has won the Icelandic Championship and the Icelandic Cup as many times as the Valur men's team. The team's greatest achievement was undoubtedly reaching the final of the EHF Champions League in 1980, which it lost against the German TV Grosswallstadt. The final was played in the Munich Olympic Hall and was lost 21:12. Since then, no Icelandic club team has reached the finals of a European competition.

Crest, colours, supporters

Kit manufacturers

Kits

Team

Current squad 

Squad for the 2022–23 season

Technical staff
 Head Coach:  Snorri Guðjónsson
 Assistant Coach:  Óskar Bjarni Óskarsson
 Goalkeeping Coach:  Hlynur Morthens

Transfers
Transfers for the 2022–23 season

Joining 
  Aron Pálsson from  Elverum Håndball
  Bergur Elí Rúnarsson from  FH

Leaving

Previous Squads

Accomplishments

Domestic
 Úrvalsdeild karla
 Winner (24) : 1940, 1941, 1942, 1944, 1947, 1948, 1951, 1955, 1973, 1977, 1978, 1979, 1988, 1989, 1991, 1993, 1994, 1995, 1996, 1998, 2007, 2017, 2021, 2022
 Icelandic Men's Handball Cup
 Winner (12) : 1974, 1988, 1990, 1993, 1998, 2008, 2009, 2011, 2016, 2017, 2021, 2022

International
EHF Champions League:
 Runners-up : 1979–80

European record

European Cup and Champions League

EHF ranking

Former club members

Notable former players

  Ernir Hrafn Arnarson (2006-2011)
  Fannar Fridgeirsson (2004-2010)
  Ýmir Örn Gíslason (2016-2020)
  Snorri Guðjónsson (2000-2003, 2017-2018)
  Hreiðar Guðmundsson (2022-)
  Valdimar Grímsson (1984-1994, 2000-2001)
  Arnór Þór Gunnarsson (2006-2010)
  Björgvin Páll Gústavsson (2021–)
  Guðmundur Hólmar Helgason (2013-2016)
  Guðmundur Hrafnkelsson (1991-1999)
  Daníel Þór Ingason (2013–2016)
  Einar Örn Jónsson (1995-2000)
  Ólafur Jónsson (1965-1975, 1984-1985)
  Kári Kristján Kristjánsson (2014-2015)
  Ómar Ingi Magnússon (2014–2016)
  Markus Mani Michaelsson-Maute (-2004, 2006-2011)
  Anton Rúnarsson (2007-2012, 2016-2021)
  Árni Þór Sigtryggsson (2017–2018)
  Dagur Sigurðsson (1990-1996)
  Ólafur Stefánsson (1984–1996)
  Geir Sveinsson (1980-1989, 1999–2003)
  Josip Jurić-Grgić (2016-2017)
  Motoki Sakai (2021-)

Former coaches

References

External links
  
 

Handball teams in Iceland
Valur (club)